This is the results breakdown of the local elections held in the Canary Islands on 3 April 1979. The following tables show detailed results in the autonomous community's most populous municipalities, sorted alphabetically.

Overall

City control
The following table lists party control in the most populous municipalities, including provincial capitals (shown in bold).

Municipalities

Arona
Population: 12,740

La Laguna
Population: 112,472

Las Palmas de Gran Canaria
Population: 345,925

Santa Cruz de Tenerife
Population: 183,583

Telde
Population: 57,428

Island Cabildos

References

Canary Islands
1979